Lyndsey Jayne Cooper (born Q2.1981) is a female former international swimmer from England.

Swimming career
Cooper represented England and won a silver medal in the 4 x 200 metres freestyle relay event, at the 1998 Commonwealth Games in Kuala Lumpur, Malaysia.

References

1981 births
Living people
English female swimmers
Swimmers at the 1998 Commonwealth Games
Commonwealth Games silver medallists for England
Commonwealth Games medallists in swimming
English female freestyle swimmers
Medallists at the 1998 Commonwealth Games